The Lights, Motors, Action!: Extreme Stunt Show (or sometimes referred to as Moteurs... Action!: Stunt Show Spectacular), was a stunt show performed at Walt Disney Studios Park in Disneyland Paris and at Disney's Hollywood Studios theme park in Lake Buena Vista, Florida. The show was designed to be and look like a movie set, and the show is dedicated to show the process of how action movies are created. 

Revolving around a series of energetic stunts featuring automobiles, the show runs for just under 40 minutes, and includes scenes of car-based action, pyrotechnics, jet ski chases, and physical stuntwork. The cars are followed by cameras, and film, both shot during the show and pre-recorded, is shown to the audience on a billboard television screen.

History 
The Moteurs... Action! version of the show originally opened on time with the premiere of Walt Disney Studios Park on March 16, 2002. The Lights, Motors, Action! version of the show debuted three years later at Disney's Hollywood Studios during the Happiest Celebration on Earth festival, in which each of the four Walt Disney World theme parks opened a new attraction that have been copied from another Disney resort. The entire show has now been demolished.

Herbie, the Volkswagen from The Love Bug, previously made an appearance in an intermission in the middle of the show, but was replaced by Lightning McQueen from Cars in 2011. The show arena has scenery inspired by Villefranche-sur-Mer; a Mediterranean village in the south of France. The arena's construction at Disney's Hollywood Studios forced the Studio Tram Tour: Behind the Magic at the theme park to be almost halved in length, as the arena was built inside locations used by the backlot tour.

The show was previously sponsored at Walt Disney Studios Park by General Motors through its Opel division and at Disney's Hollywood Studios by Koch Industries through its Brawny division. On January 15, 2016, Disney announced that the Hollywood Studios location would close on April 3 for the construction of Star Wars: Galaxy's Edge and Toy Story Land. The Paris version of the show closed on March 13, 2020; nearly 18 years after it initially opened; the closure was expected as part of the Walt Disney Studios park expansion but the closure date was moved up owing to the COVID-19 pandemic in France.

Summary

Queue 
When the show is not running and when the audience is exiting or entering the stadium, queue music is played, while the billboard television screen shows trivia questions about films and movies with car chases and destruction in them.

Pre-show 
The pre-show features clips of action scenes involving car chases from various action thriller films including The Rock (1996), Con Air (1997), Enemy of the State (1998), Gone in 60 Seconds (2000), Speed (1994), and Ronin (1998). The Disney's Hollywood Studios location does not include the clips from the latter two films.

Show 

The main show starts off with the "Ballet Chase," (Sequence 7A) featuring a red "hero car" (Hero 1) being chased by five black "pursuit cars." This scene ends with the hero car jumping backwards off of a ramp, and the fifth (a specially designed pursuit) car being blown in half.

While the next scene is being set up, they observe the film and how they film with a low camera angle. They also explain how "Video Assist" works, and they introduce the hero car driver explain how a second hero car, (Hero 2) designed so that the driver faces out the back, was used for the backwards jump.

The next scene, the "Blockade Chase," (Sequence 8) is set in a marketplace, with the car chase taking place around obstacles such as trucks and farm stands. The scene ends with the hero car driving up the back of a truck bed, over a second truck, and landing on an airbag.

As the third scene is being set up, a driverless hero car (Hero 3) is shown, and an audience volunteer is brought down to drive it via "remote control." After the volunteer appears to lose control of the vehicle, it is revealed that the car actually does have a driver, who is hidden on the far side of the vehicle out of sight of the audience.

The fourth sequence, the "Motorcycle Chase," (Sequence 3) begins with the "hero" going into a motorcycle shop and commandeering a blue one, (Hero 4) being chased by two black pursuit motorcycles and three cars. The "hero" later switches to a red jet ski (which was then turned black due to the first version breaking down), and eventually faces his pursuers on foot. This scene features a stuntman falling thirty feet from a building into an airbag, as well as the rider of one of the pursuit motorcycles catching on fire.

As the final scene is set up, they explain the specially treated clothing that allowed the final rider to be safely set on fire.

The final scene (Sequence 10) begins with footage being shown on the large video screen of the previous stunt sequences edited into a finished film. As the film on the screen reaches its climax, fire erupts in the canal area at the front of the stage. The hero car appears on stage, being chased by a black pursuit car, and heads behind one of the buildings. A few seconds later, the hero car reenters from the second story of the building, down the bed of a truck parked in front of the building, and jumps a ramp across the canal directly towards the audience. Fireworks and explosions are set off as the car exits through a tunnel under the grandstands.

Afterward, a curtain call of all of the vehicles used in the movie shoot is shown, with the black pursuit cars and motorcycles, and all of the faces of the hero in the film (the three red hero cars and the blue motorcycle). The stunt coordinator then explains that all of the vehicles that were shown during the show were specifically designed for all the stunts in the movie shoot and that all of the drivers and stunt people were highly trained and skilled at what they do, and that to not try any of the stunts at home. The crew then tells the audience to enjoy the rest of the day at Disney's Hollywood Studios (or some other variation in France) and to drive safely.

The vehicles then exit the visible part of the stage to the audience, but the red hero car (Hero 1) is the last car to leave. The red hero car does three drifting turns, waves at the audience at the same time, and exits the stage. The ending music then plays, and the television screen returns to its original picture.

Vehicles

The show has more than 40 vehicles in the show and backstage in the maintenance garage. The primary "hero" car, which the action revolves around, is a custom-built design for the show, while the pursuit cars are Opel Corsas. The hero cars are all painted red while the pursuit cars are painted black, to easily allow guests to tell the difference between them.

The show also includes specially-designed cars that look identical to the others used in the show, two of which are red "hero" cars. One substitute hero car has the bodyshell oriented backwards, to allow the driver to appear to be driving in reverse; the other has a seat and steering wheel bolted onto the side of the car away from the audience, so that the car appears to be driving without anyone inside the vehicle. One of the substitute black "pursuit" cars is cut in half behind the front doors, so that it can appear to explode during a scene in the show.

All the cars, while they appear simple, are reinforced with rally car roll cages for driver safety and are powered by Suzuki Hayabusa 1300 cc  motorcycle engines mounted directly behind the driver's seat. The cars transmissions have four sequential forward and four sequential reverse gears, allowing them to be driven backwards at high speed.

The cars have a bump shift for easier gear shifting: the driver bumps the shifter forward to go up a gear, and back to go back a gear. In order to reverse, the driver twists the top of the shifter and bumps it forwards or backwards. The emergency brake automatically releases when the driver lets go. The drivers wear heavy protective suits. To keep them cool, a cooling system in the front of the car pumps cold water through the suits. The show also features jet skis on the small canal at the front of the theater, and motorcycles which maneuver around the cars.

References

External links
 Walt Disney World Resort - Lights, Motors, Action! Extreme Stunt Show
 

Former Walt Disney Parks and Resorts attractions
Backlot (Walt Disney Studios Park)
Disney's Hollywood Studios
Streets of America
Walt Disney Studios Park
Walt Disney Parks and Resorts entertainment
Buildings and structures demolished in 2016
2002 establishments in France
2020 disestablishments in France
2005 establishments in Florida
2016 disestablishments in Florida